Cladius difformis, the bristly rose slug, is a species of common sawfly in the family Tenthredinidae. They go through several generations a year. Can cause damage to roses, raspberries and strawberries. Native to the Palaearctic, probably accidentally introduced in the Nearctic.

Life cycle

References

External links

Tenthredinidae
Articles created by Qbugbot